The Mamund  (or Mamond) is a Pashtun clan which is a part of the larger Tarkani tribe. The clan is located principally in the Watelai valley (also known as Mamund Valley), Bajaur, but also owns villages on both sides of the Durand Line. Majority of the Mamund Pashtuns live in Mamund Subdivision, Loi Mamund Tehsil and Wara Mamund Tehsil, Bajaur, Khyber Pukhtunkhwa, Pakistan and in Marawara, Asadabad, Shigal, Watapur and Ghazi Abad Districts of Kunar Province in Afghanistan.

The Mamund clan is split into two divisions: Kakazai (Loi Mamund) and Wur (Wara Mamund).

References

Sarbani Pashtun tribes
Kunar Province
Bajaur Agency
People from Bajaur District
Ethnic groups in Laghman Province
Ethnic groups in Kunar Province